William Edward Mattocks House is a historic home located at Swansboro, Onslow County, North Carolina. It was started in 1901 and completed in the 1910s.  It is a -story, Colonial Revival style frame dwelling.  It has board-and-batten siding, a steeply pitched gable roof with dormers, and two-tier engaged porch.  Also on the property is a similar -story frame house built about 1931 and operated as a cafe.

It was listed on the National Register of Historic Places in 1989.

References

Houses on the National Register of Historic Places in North Carolina
Colonial Revival architecture in North Carolina
Houses completed in 1901
Houses in Onslow County, North Carolina
National Register of Historic Places in Onslow County, North Carolina